AIP Records  is a record label that was started by Greg Shaw's Bomp! Records in 1983 to continue the Pebbles series. AIP stands for "Archive International Productions". The first 10 volumes in the Pebbles series had been released by BFD Records of Kookaburra, Australia (most likely a fictitious label name to avoid copyright infringement lawsuits) in 1979–1980 and have been kept in print by AIP for many years. Including those in the companion Highs in the Mid-Sixties series – which concentrated on American regional music scenes – there are over 50 LPs covering some 800 obscure, mostly American "Original Punk Rock" songs recorded in the mid-1960s – primarily known today as the garage rock and psychedelic rock genres – that were previously known only to a handful of collectors.

Two similar series of LPs featuring British music were released in the ensuing years, the English Freakbeat series and Electric Sugar Cube Flashbacks series. Although LPs are still available from the Bomp! Records website, none are being manufactured any longer; and many are now out of print, including all of the Freakbeat and Flashbacks discs.

AIP Records also issued numerous CDs in the English Freakbeat series and Pebbles series, with the first 6 Pebbles volumes being basically the same as the LPs, with bonus tracks. The 6th Pebbles album was reissued more appropriately as the 6th CD in the English Freakbeat series, since this LP also featured British music. Most of the later Pebbles CDs were taken from particular regions, like the Highs series. In 2007, AIP Records released the Pebbles, Volume 11 CD as the last of the albums in this landmark series.

AIP Records has begun the Essential Pebbles series, the Planetary Pebbles series, and the You Gotta Have Moxie series. With the exception of an album called New Fruit by Sky Saxon, former leader of the Seeds, all of the AIP releases are in one of these series.

See also
 List of record labels

References

External links
AIP Records mail order site
AIP Records historical information

Record labels established in 1983
American independent record labels
Garage rock record labels
Reissue record labels